The third series of the British television sitcom Absolutely Fabulous premiered on BBC One on 30 March 1995 and concluded on 11 May 1995, consisting of six episodes. The third series was originally intended to be the final series of Absolutely Fabulous. However, the following year, Jennifer Saunders decided to write a two-part special titled "The Last Shout", serving as an official finale to the third series. Two additional series were eventually produced.

Guest stars for this series include Rebecca Front, Kate O'Mara, Celia Imrie, Naomi Campbell, Helen Lederer, Kathy Burke and Ruby Wax.

Cast and characters

Main
 Jennifer Saunders as Edina Monsoon
 Joanna Lumley as Patsy Stone 
 Julia Sawalha as Saffron Monsoon 
 Jane Horrocks as Bubble
 June Whitfield as Mother

Recurring
 Naoko Mori as Sarah
 Caroline Waldron as Caroline
 Lulu as herself
 Kathy Burke as Magda

Guest

 Kate O'Mara as Jackie
 Christopher Malcolm as Justin
 Gary Beadle as Oliver
 Christopher Ryan as Marshall
 Rebecca Front as Cherysh
 James Dreyfus as Christopher
 Ian Gelder as David
 Idris Elba as Hilton
 Andrew Loudon as Geoff
 Lee Walters as boy 1
 Ben Soamers as boy 2
 Damien Hunt as Serge
 Stewart Piper as Serge
 Corran Royal as Serge
 Celia Imrie as Claudia Bing
 Naomi Campbell as herself
 Simon Stokes as Gerard
 Paul Reynold as Squeak
 Peter Richardson as Tony
 Joanna Bowen as journalist
 Helen Lederer as Catriona
 Harriet Thorpe as Fleur
 John Hudson as lecturer
 David Cardy as candid cameraman
 Louis Hillier as candid cameraman
 Kevin Allen as Ben
 Mossie Smith as Diane
 Ruby Wax as Candy
 Suzanne Bertish as Gina
 Sean Chapman as Santé
 Mo Gaffney as Bo
 Josie Lawrence as cable TV presenter
 Max Brandt as Mitchell Friedman
 Drew Elliot as Justice of the Peace
 C.G. Varesko as New York transvestite
 Raven Oh as New York transvestite
 Andre Shoals as New York transvestite
 Rupert Penry-Jones as boy at party
 Daniela Denby-Ashe as Saffy's daughter
 Danny Newman as Saffy's son

"The Last Shout" guest cast

 Tom Hollander as Paolo
 Christopher Malcolm as Justin
 Mo Gaffney as Bo
 Helen Lederer as Catriona
 Marianne Faithfull as God
 Marcella Detroit as Angel
 P. P. Arnold as the voice of Sue Lawley
 Christopher Ryan as Marshall
 Carmen du Sautoy as Kalishia
 Alan Talbot as Carlo
 Dora Bryan as Millie
 Ed Devereaux as Mac
 Gary Beadle as Oliver
 Kathy Burke as Magda
 Harriet Thorpe as Fleur
 Naoko Mori as Sarah
 Candida Gubbins as shop assistant
 Georgina Grenville as Gucci girl
 Connor Burrowes as choirboy
 Calum MacLeod as vicar
 Nicky Clarke as himself
 Suzy Menkes as herself
 Christian Lacroix as himself
 Bruce Oldfield as himself
 Christopher Biggins as himself

Episodes

Accolades

Home media
VHS (United Kingdom)
 Series 3 – Volume 1: "Doorhandle" / "Happy New Year" / "Sex" – 2 October 1995
 Series 3 – Volume 2: "Jealous" / "Fear" / "The End" – 2 October 1995
 The Complete Series 3 – 25 November 2002
 As part of the "Series 1-3" (6-VHS set) – 24 January 2000
 As part of the "Series 1-4" (8-VHS set) – 25 November 2002

DVD (Region 1)
 "Complete Series 3" – 13 March 2001
 "Complete Series 3" re-release – 13 September 2005
 As part of "Complete Series 1–3" (4-disc set) – 13 March 2001
 As part of "Complete Series 1–3" re-release (4-disc set) – 4 October 2005
 As part of "Absolutely Fabulous: Absolutely All of It!" (9-disc set) – 27 May 2008
 As Part of the "Absolutely Fabulous: Absolutely All of It!" DVD set - 5 November 2013 (10-disc set includes Series 1-5, specials & 20th Anniversary Specials)

DVD (Region 2)
 "Series 3" – 12 November 2001
 As part of "Series 1–4" (5-disc set) – 25 November 2002
 As part of "Absolutely Fabulous: Absolutely Everything" (10-disc set) – 15 November 2010
 As part of "Absolutely Fabulous: Absolutely Everything - The Definitive Edition" (11-disc set) – 17 March 2014

DVD (Region 4)
 "Series 3" – 1 July 2002
 As part of "Absolutely Fabulous: Absolutely Everything"  (9-disc set) – 20 April 2006
 As part of "Absolutely Fabulous: Complete Collection" (10-disc set) – 5 April 2011
 As Part of the "Absolutely Everything: Definitive Edition" (11-disc set) – 30 April 2014

The Last Shout
 United States
 DVD as part of "Absolutely Fabulous: Absolutely Special" – 30 September 2003 (includes 2002 special "Gay")
 DVD as part of "Absolutely Fabulous: Absolutely Special" re-release – 8 May 2007 (Includes 2002 special "Gay)
 DVD as part of "Absolutely Fabulous: Absolutely All of It!" – 5 November 2013
 United Kingdom
 VHS – 11 November 1996
 VHS re-release – 1 October 1999
 DVD – 27 November 2000
 DVD as part of Absolutely Fabulous: Absolutely Everything – 15 November 2010
 DVD as part of "Absolutely Fabulous: Absolutely Everything - The Definitive Edition" – 17 March 2014
 Australia
 DVD – 20 July 2002
 DVD as part of "Absolutely Fabulous: Absolutely Everything" – 20 April 2006
 DVD as part of "Absolutely Fabulous: Complete Collection – 5 April 2011
 DVD as part of "Absolutely Fabulous: Absolutely Everything - The Definitive Edition" – 30 April 2014

Other media
Prior to the third series, a dramatized behind-the-scenes special was broadcast on 6 January 1995. The special was titled 'How to Be Absolutely Fabulous' and featured Jennifer Saunders as she enters the BBC studio in which the woman at reception is unaware of who Saunders is. Unable to convince the receptionist that she is in fact Edina for the series, Saunders, along with the camera crew runs up to the Absolutely Fabulous office, despite being refused access from the receptions. Once in the office, Saunders talks about the origins of the series. The special features clips from the series.

A second special, released in 1998 and titled 'Absolutely Fabulous: A Life' features Edina and her mother as she and a camera crew are filming the story of Edina's life in a documentary. The setting for the documentary is in the charity shop in which her mother works. Edina talks about her surroundings in the charity shop, a setting that she is unaccustomed to and certainly is not to her taste. She also reminisces about her life. The special features clips from the series.

Both specials were featured outside of the actual series and are not included or counted as episodes.

References

External links
 Absolutely Fabulous series 3 – list of episodes on IMDb

1995 British television seasons
Series 3